This is a list of European automobile manufacturers by country. It is a subset of the list of automobile manufacturers for manufacturers based in European countries. It includes companies that are in business as well as defunct manufacturers.

International European brands
Anglo-French
Intrall 
Magomobil – Austro-Hungarian

Armenia
ErAZ

Austria
Austro-Daimler
Austro-Tatra
Custoca (also known as Custoka)
Denzel
Eurostar Automobilwerk
Felber Autoroller
Gräf & Stift
Grofri
KTM
Libelle
Lohner–Porsche (1900–1905)
Magna Steyr
Möve 101
ÖAF
Puch, Steyr automobile, Steyr Motors GmbH and Steyr-Daimler-Puch
Rosenbauer
Tushek&Spigel Supercars

Azerbaijan
Azermash
AzSamand
AzUniversal Motors
BakAZ
Ganja Auto Plant
Khazar 
Nakhchivan Automobile Plant

Belarus
Amkodor
BelAZ
Belkommunmash
GomSelMash
GZLIN
Lidagroprommash
Minsk Automobile Plant
MoAZ
MTZ
MZKT
Neman
Unison

Belgium
 ADK (1922-1930)
 Alatac (1913-1914)
 ALP (1920)
 Antoine (1900-1903)
 Apal (1964-1998)
 Astra (1930)
 Auto-Mixte (1906-1912)
 Belga Rise (1928-1937)
 De Wandre (c. 1923)
 Delecroix (1899)
 Edran
 Exelsior (1903-1930)
 Flaid (1920-1921)
 FN (1899–1939)
 Gillet
 Impéria
 Jeecy-Vea (1925-1926)
 Juwel (1923-1928)
 Meeussen (1955-1972)
 Métallurgique  (1898–1928)
 Minerva (1902-1939)
 Nagant (1859-1931)
 Pieper (1899–1912)
 Pipe  (1898–1914)
 Springuel (1907-1914)
 Van Hool
 Vivinus (1899–1914)

Bosnia and Herzegovina
 Tvornica Automobila Sarajevo (TAS)

Bulgaria
Balcancar record
Balkan 
BG Car
Bulgarrenault (1966-1970)
Bulgaralpine (1966-1970)
Chavdar
Kenta
KTA Madara
Litex Motors (2008-2017)
Moskvitch Aleko (1966-1990)
Pirin-Fiat (1967-1971)
Preslav
SIN
Sofia

Croatia
DOK-ING
Đuro Đaković
Rimac
TAZ
Tomo Vinković

Cyprus
 KMC
 Andys Motors

Czech Republic

Active brands
Avia (1919–present)
Gordon (1997–present)
Jawa (1929–present)
Kaipan (1997–present)
Hyundai Czech (2008–present)
Karosa (1896–present (since 2007 IVECO BUS))
MTX / Metalex (1969–present)
Praga (1907–present)
Škoda (1895–present)
SOR Libchavy (1991–present)
Tatra (1850–present)
TEDOM (1991–present)
TPCA (Toyota Peugeot Citroën Automobile Czech) (2002–present)
Zetor (1946–present)
Sigma motor (2017-present)

Former brands
Aero (1929-1947)
LIAZ (1951-2002)
Velorex (1951-1971)
Walter (1909-1954)
RAF (Reichenberger Automobil Fabrik) (1907-1954)
Wikov (1925–37)
Zbrojovka Brno (1923–36)
Rösler & Jauernig (1896-1908)
Aspa (1924–25)
Gatter (1926–37)
Gnom (1921–24)
Hakar
ISIS (1922–24)
KAN (1911–14)
Premier (1913–14)
Sibrava (1921–29)
Start (1921–31)
Stelka (1920-1922)
Hoffmann & Novague (2014-2020)

Denmark
 Alfgang (1912-1914)
 Anglo-Dane (1902-1917)
 Brems (1900-1904)
 Bukh & Gry (1904-1905)
 Dana (c. 1908-1914)
 Danish Automobile Building
 Dansk (1901-1908)
DK (1950)
Ellemobil (1909-1913)
Gideon (1913-1920)
Hammel (1887-1888)
Houlberg (c. 1913-1921)
Hydrema
Kewet
Thrige (1911-1918)
Zenvo

Estonia
 ESTfield
 Tartu Autode Remondi Katsetehas (TARK, Tartu Cars' Repair Testing Factory)
 RexeR

Finland
 Elcat 
 Electric Raceabout (prototype, not in production)
 Finlandia (1922–1924)
 Korvensuu (1912–1913)
 Sisu Auto
 Toroidion (prototype, not yet in production)
 Valmet Automotive
 Vanaja (1943–1968)
 Valtra
 Veemax  (racecar, 1960s - 1978)
 Wiima

France

Germany

Greece
 Alta (1968-1978)
 Attica (1958-1972)
 Autokinitoviomihania Ellados (1975-1984)
 Automeccanica (1980-1995)
 Balkania (1975-1995)
 BET (1965-1975)
 Biamax
 BIOMAN
 BIOMOT
 Bouhagier Patras
 C.AR (1970-1992)
 Diana
 DIM (1977-1982)
 ELBO
 Grezda (1969-1985)
 Hercules (1980-1983)
 Korres
 MEBEA (1960-1983)
 Motoemil
 NAMCO
 Neorion (1974-1975)
 Pan-Car (1968-1994)
 Replicar Hellas
 SAM
 Saracakis
 Scavas (1973-1992)
 Sfakianakis
 Styl Kar (1970)
 Sunnyclist
 Super Car
 Tangalakis (1935-1939)
 Thelogou (1918-1926)
 Tropical
 Tzen

Hungary
 Alba Regia (1955)
 Balaton (1955)
 Borbála (1986-1990)
 Credo
 Csepel (1949-1996)
 Csonka (1909-1924)
 Fejes (1923-1932)
 Ha (1928-1929)
 Helix
 Ikarus 
 MÁG (1911-1934)
 Magomobil
 Marta (1908-1922)
 Mávag (1938-1942)
 Méray (1923-1934)
 Phönix (1904-1912)
 Puli (1990-c.1997)
 Rába
 Unitas
 Úttörő (1954)
 Weiss-Manfréd (1927-1932)

Ireland
 Alesbury (1907-1908)
 GAC Ireland (1980-1986)
 Shamrock
 TMC Costin

Italy

Latvia
 Alexander Leutner
 Dartz
 Drive e0
Ford-Vairogs
RAF
Russo-Balt
VEF

Lithuania
 KAG

Liechtenstein
 Jehle (1977-1991)
 Orca Engineering

North Macedonia
 Comsove
 Sanos

Monaco
 Monte Carlo Automobile
 Venturi

Netherlands
 Aerts (1899)
 Altena (1900-1906)
 Anderheggen (1899-1902)
 Bij 't Vuur (1902-1906)
 Brons (1907-2004)
 Burton
 Carver
DAF
Den Oudsten
Donkervoort
Entrop (1909)
Eysink (1903-1919)
Hillen (c.1913)
GINAF
LandFighter
Ruska
Shelter (1956)
Spyker (1880-1926)
Spyker cars
Spijkstaal
Terberg
United bus (1989-1993)
Van Gink
Vandenbrink
VDL
Vencer
Waaijenberg

Norway
Bjering (1918-1920)
Buddy
C. Geijer
Clarin Mustad (1917-1918)
FYK
Høka
Moxy
Norsk (1907-1911)
Strømmens Værksted
Think(1991-2011)
Troll (1956-1958)

Poland

Arrinera (2008–present)
AMZ-Kutno
Autosan
CWS (1918-1931)
Fiat Auto Poland-Polski Fiat
FSC
FSM (1971-1992)
FSO
FSR
Jelcz
Kapena
Leopard (2005–present)
LRL
Melex
Mikrus (1957-1960)
PZInż. (1928-1939)
Ralf-Stetysz
San (1967-1974)
Smyk
Solaris
Solbus
Ursus
ZSD

Portugal
Bravia
Edfor
Entreposto
Marlei
Salvador Caetano
UMM (União Metalo-Mecânica)
Vinci

Romania
AA&WF
Astra
ARO (1957-2006)
C&I Eurotrans XXI
Craiova
DAC
Dacia
El Car
Grivița
M.R.
Malaxa (1945)
Oltcit
Rocar (1951-2002)
Roman
ROMLOC
Uzinele Braşov

Russia
 
A Level
Altay
Amur (1967-2012)
Avtokad (2000–present)
AZLK/Moskvitch
Bronto (1993–present)
Derways (2006–present)
Doninvest (1991-2014(?))
Dragon
EL Motors (1997–present)
GAZ/Volga
GolAZ
IZH
KAvZ
KIM (1930-1947)
Lessner (1904-1909)
Marussia (2007-2014)
Nami (1927)
NefAZ
PAZ
SeAZ
Silant
Sollers JSC
TagAZ
Torgmash
UAZ
UralAZ
VAZ/Lada (1970–present)
VIS
Volgabus
ZIL (1958–present)
ZIS (1936-1958)

Serbia
FAP
FVK
Globus-auto
IDA-Opel
Ikarbus
IMR
IMT
Neobus
FCA Serbia
Zastava Special Automobiles
Zastava TERVO
Zastava Trucks
Zastava/Yugo

Slovakia
 BAZ
 K-1 Engineering
 TAZ (1973-1999)

Slovenia
Adria Mobil
Avtomontaža
CIMOS
IMV
REVOZ
Shayton
Sistemska tehnika
Valuk
Krpan 8x8
TAM-Durabus
Tovarna avtomobilov Maribor
Tomos 
Tushek
Renovatio T500

Spain
AFA
America
Anglada
Avia
Ayats
Barreiros
Beulas
Biscúter
Cupra 
David
Ebro
Elizalde
ENASA
Eucort
GTA Motor
Hispano Suiza
Hurtan
IFR
Indcar
Irizar
Izaro
Kapi
 La Cuadra
Nogebus
Pegaso
Santana Motor
SEAT
Tauro Sport Auto
Tramontana
URO
UROVESA

Sweden

Switzerland
 Ajax (1906-1910)
 Albar
 Carrosserie Hess
 Cree SAM
 Dufaux (1904-1907)
Enzmann
FBW
Leblanc
Martini (1897-1934)
Maximag (1923-1927)
Monteverdi (1967-1984)
Mowag
NanoFlowcell
Pic-Pic (1906-1924)
Rinspeed
Sbarro
Saurer (1903-1982)
Tribelhorn (1902-1920)
Turicum (1904-1912)
Yaxa (1912-1914)
Zédel (1901-1905)

Turkey
 BMC
 Karsan
 Otokar
 TEMSA
 Togg

Ukraine
AntoRus
Bogdan Corporation
LuAZ
Etalon-Avto Corporation
BAZ
ChAZ
Stryi-Avto
Eurocar
HalAZ
Iveco Motor Sich
VEPR
KrASZ
Torsus
ZAZ/AvtoZAZ

United Kingdom

Sources
 Nick Georgano, (Ed.). The Beaulieu Encyclopedia of the Automobile. Chicago: Fitzroy Dearborn, 2000. 
 Mazur, Eligiusz (Ed.). World of Cars 2006/2007: Worldwide Car Catalogue.  Warsaw: Media Connection, 2006. ISSN 1734-2945

See also
List of automobile manufacturers
List of automobile marques
List of motorcycle manufacturers
List of truck manufacturers
Timeline of European automobiles

Car-related lists
Lists of cars
Automobiles
Automotive industry in Europe
Lists of automobile manufacturers